The New Adventures of Nanoboy is an animated series produced by Scrawl Studios Pte. Ltd in Singapore, Media Development Authority of Singapore now Infocomm Media Development Authority, and Agogo Entertainment Limited in Hong Kong and distributed by Cookie Jar Entertainment (now owned by WildBrain).

The series follows the adventures of a 9-year-old boy named Oscar, who has faced some issues in his life. By dealing with these issues, he shrinks down to a microscopic superhero as Nanoboy and he'll stop at nothing to save the Microcosmos from the microbe villains.

Characters

Nanosquad
Oscar/Nanoboy - Voiced by Joe Murray https://www.imdb.com/name/nm2579931/. The main hero/character of the series as he is the Team Leader of the Nanosquad. He has the ability to fly and he also has super strength attacks.
Issac Neuron - Voiced by Hillary Blazer-Doyle. The field scientist of the Nanosquad.
Corona Jane (CJ) - Voiced by Christina Sergeant. A reformed flu virus in a shapechanging bodysuit. She can shape shift into almost anything.

Allies 

Tim is Oscar's best friend. He can depend on Oscar in an easygoing way.
Prof. David Stein is a professor who is researching the Microcosmos. He is Oscar's father.
Dora is Oscar's mother.
Vicky is a bossy girl in school. She can prove that she is way better than Oscar.
Chuck is Oscar's cousin who likes to mess things up. Eventually Oscar apologizes though he is busy but they still play together.
Commander Flag is a commander who provides mission objectives to the Nanosquad.
Diva Farangitis is a Diva of the Microcosmos.
Colonel Skeeter also called Colonel Perry whom he also helps the Nanosquad on a mission to rescue Commander Flag.

Villains
Czar Zar is a villain of the Microcosmos.
Careena Payne is the evil sidekick to Czar Zar. She is Corona Jane's evil sister.
Ferro is the Pharaoh like person who is the Magnetic Microbe Menace.
Mito is a mad scientist of the Microcosmos. She wants her voice to be like Farangitis.
Count Bacula is a vampire of Ransylvania.
Lacto is a villain of the Microcosmos.
Billy the Spit is the old west germ rides into town with his quick shot saliva.
Tony Verrero is an evil Groovester in Groovy Attraction.

Episodes

Broadcast
In the United States the series aired on Starz Kids & Family from 2008–10  and on Vortexx in 2013. In Israel, the series aired on Arutz HaYeladim.  In the United Kingdom, Pop aired the series between 2008–11. In Asia-Pacific, the series aired on Cartoon Network in 2011.

DVD and VOD releases
On 27 July 2010, First ten episodes of Nanoboy was released on DVD by Mill Creek Entertainment in the US which includes a bonus episode of World of Quest.

On 2 September 2016, The complete series is available for streaming on Amazon Video.

References

External links
Retrojunk: The New Adventures of Nanoboy
 
MSN TV Episode Gude for The New Adventures of Nanoboy

Canadian children's animated action television series
Canadian children's animated adventure television series
Canadian children's animated comedy television series
Canadian children's animated superhero television series
Singaporean animated television series
Canadian flash animated television series
Television series by Cookie Jar Entertainment
2008 Canadian television series debuts
2013 Canadian television series endings
2008 Singaporean television series debuts
2013 Singaporean television series endings
2000s Canadian animated television series
2010s Canadian animated television series
Animated television series about children
English-language television shows
Television series by DHX Media